Hirakoba Dam is a concrete gravity dam located in Saga Prefecture in Japan. The dam is used for flood water control and water supply. The catchment area of the dam is 2.2 km2. The dam impounds about 10  ha of land when full and can store 1080 thousand cubic meters of water. The construction of the dam was started on 1972 and completed in 1983.

References

Dams in Saga Prefecture
1983 establishments in Japan